is a Japanese footballer. He is a defender and can also play as a midfielder.

He was educated at and played for Japan Soccer College before moving to Singapore.

Despite playing little in 2016, his contract is extended for the 2017 season.

He signed for Albirex Niigata FC (Singapore) from the S.League in 2016 having graduated from Japan Soccer College.

Club career statistics
As of Jan 2, 2017

External links

References

1997 births
Living people
Association football people from Akita Prefecture
Japanese footballers
Singapore Premier League players
Japan Soccer College players
Albirex Niigata Singapore FC players
Association football forwards
Sportspeople from Akita Prefecture
Akita FC Cambiare players